"Roses Are Red" is the name of a love poem and children's rhyme with Roud Folk Song Index number  19798.  It has become a cliché for Valentine's Day, and has spawned multiple humorous and parodic variants.

A modern standard version is:

Origins
The rhyme builds on poetic conventions that are traceable as far back as Edmund Spenser's epic The Faerie Queene of 1590:

A rhyme similar to the modern standard version can be found in Gammer Gurton's Garland, a 1784 collection of English nursery rhymes published in London by Joseph Johnson:

Victor Hugo was probably familiar with Spenser, but may not have known the English nursery rhyme when he published his novel Les Misérables in 1862. A song by the character Fantine contains this refrain:

In his English translation published in the same year, Charles Edwin Wilbour rendered this as:

This translation replaces the original version's cornflowers ("bleuets") with violets, and makes the roses red rather than pink, effectively making the song closer to the English nursery rhyme.

Folklore
The short poem has since become a snowclone, and numerous satirical versions have long circulated in children's lore. Among them:

Country music singer Roger Miller parodied the poem in a verse of his 1964 hit "Dang Me":

The Marx Brothers' film Horse Feathers has Chico Marx describing the symptoms of cirrhosis thus:

The Benny Hill version:

Notes

English nursery rhymes
Love poems
English folk songs
English children's songs
Traditional children's songs